Reidsville is a city in, and county seat of, Tattnall County, Georgia. The population was 4,944 at the 2010 census. The Georgia State Prison is near Reidsville.

History
Reidsville was founded in about 1828 and was designated county seat of Tattnall County in 1832 by the Georgia General Assembly. It was incorporated as a town in 1838 and as a city in 1905. The city was named after Robert R. Reid, territorial governor of Florida.

Reidsville is home to the Nelson Hotel Bed & Breakfast.

During the events of World War II, Reidsville was the home to at least one, though some reports suggest two, prisoner of war camps for captured Nazi personnel. The prison camp's location has largely been lost to time, but is believed to have stood near the current location of a gas station/self-storage company, near the fringes of the city. Archaeological research into the area has turned up a number of German artifacts, though with the development and addition of a number of houses, it is not clear if this was the location of the camp, or one of the many onion fields in which the prisoners worked.

Geography
Reidsville is located at  (32.083970, -82.120697).

Demographics

2020 census

As of the 2020 United States census, there were 2,515 people, 1,189 households, and 694 families residing in the city.

2000 census
As of the census of 2000, there were 2,235 people, 894 households, and 544 families residing in the city. The racial makeup of the city was 57.58% White, 33.83% African American, 0.18% Native American, 0.45% Asian, 0.04% Pacific Islander, 6.98% from other races, and 0.94% from two or more races. Hispanic or Latino of any race were 8.37% of the population.

There were 894 households, out of which 28.1% had children under the age of 18 living with them, 38.7% were married couples living together, 18.5% had a female householder with no husband present, and 39.1% were non-families. 35.5% of all households were made up of individuals, and 16.2% had someone living alone who was 65 years of age or older. The average household size was 2.37 and the average family size was 3.08.

In the city, the population was spread out, with 24.8% under the age of 18, 8.9% from 18 to 24, 25.6% from 25 to 44, 24.5% from 45 to 64, and 16.2% who were 65 years of age or older. The median age was 38 years. For every 100 females, there were 96.7 males. For every 100 females age 18 and over, there were 92.4 males.

The median income for a household in the city was $25,901, and the median income for a family was $33,563. Males had a median income of $31,905 versus $20,184 for females. The per capita income for the city was $14,625. About 21.4% of families and 27.2% of the population were below the poverty line, including 40.2% of those under age 18 and 22.0% of those age 65 or over.

Government and infrastructure

The United States Postal Service operates the Reidsville Post Office.

The Georgia Department of Corrections operates the Georgia State Prison in unincorporated Tattnall County, near Reidsville.

Education

Tattnall County School District 
The Tattnall County School District holds pre-school to grade twelve, and consists of three elementary schools, two middle schools, and a high school. The district has 201 full-time teachers and over 3,305 students.

Schools in Reidsville:
Reidsville Elementary School
North Tattnall Middle School

Nearby Tattnall County High School serves the city.

Notable people
James Kicklighter - film director, attended Reidsville Elementary School and Reidsville Middle School, before graduating from Tattnall County High School. 
Lena Baker - first and only woman to be executed by the electric chair in Georgia was executed in Georgia State Prison, Reidsville
Linton McGee Collins - jurist
Emma Gresham - was an American teacher and politician who was mayor of Keysville, Georgia.
Jack Hill (politician) - was an American politician. A member of the Republican Party, he represented Georgia's 4th District in the Georgia State Senate.

References

Cities in Georgia (U.S. state)
Cities in Tattnall County, Georgia
County seats in Georgia (U.S. state)